

Qualifying system 
For individual diving the top twelve from the 2011 World Championships, the five continental champions and the eighteen semifinalists at the 2012 Diving World Cup will qualify a quota spot. For the pairs events the top three from the world championships, the top four from the world cup and the hosts qualify.

Qualification summary

Qualification timeline 

 African qualification tournament was not held.

Men's 3 m synchronized springboard

Men's 10 m synchronized platform

Women's 3 m synchronized springboard

Women's 10 m synchronized platform

Men's 3 m springboard 
For the individual events, any one diver can only gain 1 quota place per event for their NOC.

Men's 10 m platform

Women's 3 m springboard

Women's 10 m platform 

 Only two athletes per nation can qualify, meaning if there are less than eighteen athletes the remaining quota spots will go to the additional pool.
 Athletes listed in brackets have not qualified, rather have earned a quota spot for their nation.

References 

Qualification for the 2012 Summer Olympics
2011 in diving
2012 in diving
Diving at the 2012 Summer Olympics